Mañana may refer to:

People
Àngel Mañana (born 1985), Spanish-born Equatoguinean basketball player

Music
 "Mañana (Is Soon Enough for Me)", a 1947 song written by Peggy Lee and Dave Barbour
 "Mañana", a 1972 hit for the Bay City Rollers
 "Mañana, Mañana", a song written by Juan Gabriel
 "Mañana", a song written by Gloria Trevi
 "Mañana", a song written by Jimmy Buffett on his Son of a Son of a Sailor album
 "Mañana", a song  by German rock band Amon Düül II,  on their 1973 album Vive La Trance
 "Manana", a song by the Desaparecidos on their album Read Music/Speak Spanish
 Mañana (album), a 2005 album by Mexican band Sin Bandera
"Mañana" (Álvaro Soler and Cali y El Dandee song), a 2021 song

Media
 Mañana (newspaper), a Spanish newspaper (1938-39)
 La Mañana, a newspaper of the province of Lleida in Spain
 La Mañana (Uruguay), a Uruguayan newspaper (1914-1990s)

Other
 Mañana attitude, lax attitude to time, tardiness
 Mañana Literary Society, a 20th-century group of science fiction writers

See also
 Manana (disambiguation)
 El Mañana (disambiguation)